State Road 37 (NM 37) is a  state road that runs north-south through the Sacramento Mountains, which are part of the Lincoln National Forest in Lincoln County, in the U.S. state of New Mexico. Its southern terminus is at NM 48 several miles north of the town of Ruidoso and its northern terminus is at U.S. Route 380 (US 380) several miles west of the Town of Capitan.

Route description 
The route begins at an intersection with NM 48 slightly north of the small town of Angus. Heading westward, the route winds in and out of the Lincoln National Forest, heading through a forested terrain. After a brief stretch, the road again enters the national forest, turning west and then north near Nogal Lake. The route then resumes its north-northeasterly direction. NM 37 passes the town of Nogal after again exiting the national forest. The roadway then turns northeast, running almost parallel to US 380 for several miles. The route's northern terminus is at a junction with US 380 between Capitan and Carrizozo.

Major intersections

See also

References

External links

037
Transportation in Lincoln County, New Mexico